Phaedropsis bipunctalis is a moth in the family Crambidae. It was described by George Hampson in 1895. It is found in Grenada in the southeastern Caribbean Sea.

References

Spilomelinae
Moths described in 1895